John D. "Jay" Carroll III was a former member of the Ohio House of Representatives.

He was found dead in his home on January 11, 1985, just five days after he had taken his oath of office for his first elected position in the Ohio House of Representatives.

He was a 1973 graduate of St. Xavier High School.

References

Democratic Party members of the Ohio House of Representatives
St. Xavier High School (Ohio) alumni
1985 deaths
Year of birth missing